New Zealand Young Farmers (NZYF) is a national agricultural organisation with clubs throughout the country. It was formed in 1927 in the town of Feilding. The organisation acts as a social network for rural youth around the country and is actively involved in the education and promotion of personal skills for its members. There are over 1500 members in over 60 clubs around the country, all backed by the national organisation, which has its headquarters in Templeton, Canterbury. The organisation's current Board Chair is Jessie Waite.

History
The first Young Farmers clubs started in Feilding in 1927 and in Auckland in 1932, but much of the organisation's early growth came in the south. By the early 1930s there were eight clubs in the Otago region alone, and they formed New Zealand's first Young Farmers Federation. The federation rapidly expanded, containing 40 clubs by 1935, over half of them from Otago and with only two in the North Island.

In 1936 the young organisation moved its headquarters to the government's Department of Agriculture in Wellington and adopted a new constitution. This promoted the club's national nature, encouraging more growth in the North Island. By 1937 the federation included nearly 120 clubs, evenly distributed between the two islands. The organisation's membership dropped during World War II, but quickly recovered ground after 1945, rising to a peak of 306 clubs in 1948. A partner organisation, the Country Girls' Club, was also organised during the late 1940s. In 1972 the two organisations amalgamated to become the Federation of Rural Youth. The following year, a new constitution was accompanied by a change of name to the "New Zealand Federation of Young Farmers Clubs", a name it kept until 2003 when it became "New Zealand Young Farmers".

FMG Young Farmer of the Year
NZYF runs the annual FMG Young Farmer of the year, a major event on the rural calendar. The Contest began in 1969; the inaugural event was held in Auckland on 22 August that year. The competition was initially run by individual clubs, coming under the control of the national body in 2006.

How it works
Entry is free and open to all NZYF members. District Contests are the first stage of the Contest and are held throughout the country between October and December. The top contestants from each District Contest progress through to their local Regional Final which is held from February to April. The seven top Regional Finalists battle it out in the Grand Final for the title of FMG Young Farmer of the Year.

Each level of the competition includes both question-and-answer sessions (on both farming-related and general knowledge subjects) and practical sessions involving farm work, problem solving, and business skills.

The Grand Final is a two-day event: the first day includes the practical challenges and the evening dinner where the contestants deliver their speech on a topic specific to each of them. The Grand Final concludes with a quiz show.

Winners
Winners since the competition began are: 

1969 – Gary Frazer
1970 – Alan Anderson
1971 – Philip Bell
1972 – John Jennings
1973 – Nolan Williams	
1974 – John Miller
1975 – Paul Jarman
1976 – John Metherell
1977 – Keith Holmes
1978 – Stephen Ryan
1979 – Hans Pendergrast
1980 – James Watt
1981 – Geoffrey Kane
1982 – Colin Brown
1983 – Gerard Lynch
1984 – Douglas Brown
1985 – Malcolm Dodson
1986 – Russell Whyte
1987 – Leo Vollebregt
1988 – Hugh Wigley
1989 – Sinclair Hughes
1990 – Kerry Dwyer
1991 – Tony Blunt
1992 – Grant Catto
1993 – Peter Barry
1994 – George Steven
1995 – Warwick Catto
1996 – Philip Reid
1997 – Shaun Baxter
1998 – Steve Hines
1999 – Richard Slee
2000 – Andrew Finch
2001 – Gene Roberts
2002 – Tim Porter
2003 – Robert Kempthorne
2004 – Simon Hopcroft
2005 – David Holdaway
2006 – John McCaw
2007 – Callum Thomsen
2008 – David Skiffington
2009 – Tim O'Sullivan
2010 – Grant McNaughton
2011 - Will Grayling
2012 - Michael Lilley
2013 - Tim Van de Molen
2014 - David Kidd
2015 - Matt Bell
2016 - Athol New
2017 - Nigel Woodhead
2018 - Logan Wallace
2019 - James Robertson
2021 - Jake Jarman
2022 - Tim Dangen

See also
Agriculture in New Zealand

References

External links
New Zealand Young Farmers
Young Farmer Contest

Agricultural organisations based in New Zealand
1927 establishments in New Zealand
Youth organizations established in 1927
Farmers' organizations